Rumpler is an Austrian automotive and aircraft manufacturer.

Rumpler may also refer to:
Rumpler (surname) or Rümpler, a surname
 Rumpler Tropfenwagen, an Austrian automobile brand